

This is a list of the National Register of Historic Places listings in Windham County, Connecticut.

This is intended to be a complete list of the properties and districts on the National Register of Historic Places in Windham County, Connecticut, United States. The locations of National Register properties and districts for which the latitude and longitude coordinates are included below, may be seen in an online map.

There are 85 properties and districts listed on the National Register in the county, including 3 National Historic Landmarks.

Current listings

|}

See also

List of National Historic Landmarks in Connecticut
National Register of Historic Places listings in Connecticut

References

 
 
Windham